Streptomyces viridosporus is a bacterium species from the genus of Streptomyces. Streptomyces viridosporus produces sistomycine and lignin peroxidase. Streptomyces viridosporus can degrade lignin and humic acids. Streptomyces viridosporus also produces moenomycin A, a component of bambermycin.

See also 
 List of Streptomyces species

References

Further reading

External links
Type strain of Streptomyces viridosporus at BacDive – the Bacterial Diversity Metadatabase

viridosporus
Bacteria described in 1958